Phil Lloyd (born 26 December 1964) is an English former professional footballer who played as a central defender.

Career
Born in Hemsworth, Lloyd played for Middlesbrough, Barnsley, Darlington, Torquay United and Elmore.

References

1964 births
Living people
English footballers
Middlesbrough F.C. players
Barnsley F.C. players
Darlington F.C. players
Torquay United F.C. players
Elmore F.C. players
English Football League players
Association football defenders